Interarchy was a FTP client for macOS supporting FTP, SFTP, SCP, WebDAV and Amazon S3. It was made by Nolobe and supported many advanced features for transferring, syncing and managing files over the Internet.

Interarchy was created by Mac programmer Peter N Lewis in 1993 for Macintosh System 7. Lewis went on to form Stairways Software in 1995 to continue development of Interarchy. In 2007, Lewis sold Interarchy to Matthew Drayton of Nolobe. Drayton was an employee of Stairways Software having worked as a developer of Interarchy alongside Lewis since 2001. Interarchie was discontinued after 2017 and its website is no longer available.

Interarchy was originally called Anarchie because it was "an Archie" client. The name was changed to Interarchy in 2000 due to a conflict with a cybersquatter.

See also 
Comparison of FTP client software

References 

MacOS Internet software
Utilities for macOS
Macintosh-only software
FTP clients
SSH File Transfer Protocol clients
MacOS-only software